Daniel Harris Johnson (July 27, 1825June 15, 1900) was a Canadian American immigrant, lawyer, and judge.  He was a Wisconsin Circuit Court Judge for the last twelve years of his life.  Earlier he served three terms in the Wisconsin State Assembly.

Biography
Johnson was born in Kingston, Ontario, which was then part of Upper Canada. His father died just two years after his birth.  He had been a British Army sergeant under Wellington in the War of 1812, who remained in Canada after the war.  His mother was daughter of an American Revolutionary War volunteer. After attending Rock River Seminary, Johnson moved to Prairie du Chien, Wisconsin, in 1848. Here, he began the study of law, and, in 1849, was admitted to the State Bar of Wisconsin.

He practiced law in Prairie du Chien for several years, but, in 1854, he purchased a stake in the Prairie du Chien Courier, and soon became its sole proprietor and editor.  He returned to the practice of law in 1856, forming a partnership with W. R. Bullock, a nephew of John C. Breckinridge.  The partnership was broken by the American Civil War, when Bullock joined with the Confederacy.

In November 1860, Johnson was elected on the Republican Party ticket to represent Crawford and Bad Ax (Vernon) counties in the Wisconsin State Assembly during the 14th Wisconsin Legislature.  After the legislative session ended, in the fall of 1861, he worked as an assistant to Wisconsin Attorney General James Henry Howe.

In November 1862, he moved to Milwaukee and, for the next 16 years, practiced law with a number of different legal firms in the city.  In 1868, Milwaukee voters elected him to return to the Wisconsin Assembly.  He was re-elected in 1869.  In the 1869 session of the legislature, he was chairman of the committee on education, and in 1870, he was chairman of the committee on the judiciary.

After serving in the Assembly as a Republican, he became associated with the Liberal Republican faction in the so-called "Greeley movement", named for Horace Greeley.  He was a delegate for Wisconsin to the 1872 Liberal Republican convention in Cincinnati which nominated Greeley for president.  Greeley was subsequently also nominated by the Democratic Party, and, from that point on, Johnson became affiliated with the Democratic Party. He served in various local offices over the next decade, as city attorney and member of the Milwaukee School Board.

In 1887, he was elected to the Wisconsin Circuit Court for the Milwaukee-based 2nd Circuit.  He was re-elected without opposition in 1893, and, in 1899, when the circuit was split into two branches, he was one of the two judges elected.  He died, however, just six months after the start of his third term.

He died on June 15, 1900, in Milwaukee, Wisconsin.

Electoral history

| colspan="6" style="text-align:center;background-color: #e9e9e9;"| General Election, April 5, 1887

| colspan="6" style="text-align:center;background-color: #e9e9e9;"| General Election, April 1893

| colspan="6" style="text-align:center;background-color: #e9e9e9;"| General Election, April 4, 1899 (top two)

References

External links
 

Pre-Confederation Canadian emigrants to the United States
People from Prairie du Chien, Wisconsin
Politicians from Milwaukee
Wisconsin state court judges
Members of the Wisconsin State Assembly
Wisconsin lawyers
School board members in Wisconsin
Wisconsin Republicans
Wisconsin Democrats
Mount Morris College alumni
1825 births
1900 deaths
19th-century American politicians
19th-century American judges
19th-century American lawyers